Adhe Kangal ( Same Eyes) is a 2017 Indian Tamil-language action thriller film written and directed by Rohin Venkatesan and produced by C. V. Kumar. The film features Kalaiyarasan, Janani and Sshivada in the leading roles and Bala Saravanan plays the role of comedian, while Ghibran composes the film's music. The film had a theatrical release on 26 January 2017, coinciding with India's Republic Day to unanimously positive reviews. The film was declared as a sleeper hit at the box office. The film was remade in Kannada as Samhaara starring Chiranjeevi Sarja in the role of Kalaiyarasan, and also in Telugu as Neevevaro with Aadhi reprising Kalaiyarasan's role.

Plot
Varun Murali is a well-known blind chef and the owner of a popular restaurant in Chennai. One night, Deepa visits his restaurant asking for leftover food for the homeless. Varun helps her and eventually falls in love with her daily visits. Meanwhile, Varun's close relative, Sadhana alias 'Sadhu' approaches his parents and reveals her intentions of marrying Varun, which they accept. Varun decides to propose to Deepa in his restaurant, but he observes that she is in tears. She tells him that henchmen were pressing for their money, and her father had promised to return the money in three days. Varun promises to help out from his own savings. On the same night, Varun is met with an accident and is hospitalized, during which his vision is restored. He is treated for three weeks, and the hospital fee is paid out of his savings. Varun feels guilty and is disappointed for not helping out Deepa. When he is discharged, he is unable to locate her. When his family presses him to marry Sadhana, he agrees as he also likes her from his childhood days.

Several days later, an old man walks into the restaurant telling how his daughter Deepa has been kidnapped as they were unable to return the money. Varun calms him down and hatches a plan to hand over his wedding jewelry, but is conned of the jewels by the kidnapper. Later, Varun gets to know that Deepa's father is found dead at Kanyakumari in a road accident. Varun decides to visit Kaniyakumari himself to get clarity about Deepa's family. He works with a constable Panju, faking his identity, as a journalist investigating the road accidents where the victim remains unidentified. They decide to find the whereabouts of the old man, and they gather several clues on his hotel residence and phone number. These clues lead them to investigate the car that was involved in the accident and track down its owner as a blind man. After listening to his story, they get hold of photos of his girlfriend Vasundhara, and with Sadhana's help, they identify her as Deepa, Varun's ex-girlfriend.

They find out that Vasundhara is a con artist and selects only blind men. She makes the blind men fall for her and then presents a story with a need for money, which the blind men give. Varun and Panju find the commonality and pinpoint a list of potential targets. Sadhana, with the help of her journalist associates, finds out the plan to con another blind man in Erode. They immediately travel to Erode and catch Vasundhara after several twists in the plot. The movie ends with Panju receiving commemorations from people for his efforts in nabbing Vasundhara.

Cast
 Kalaiyarasan as Varun Murali
 Janani as Sadhana 
 Sshivada as Vasundhra alias Deepa and Ashwini
 Bala Saravanan as Panju
 Aravindraj as Ravi
 Linga as Thomas
 Abishek Joseph George as Manoj
 Sanjay Jayaraman as Vikram
 Abdool as Alphonse

Production
C. V. Kumar launched a project to be directed by Rohin Venkatesan during late May 2016, with Kalaiyarasan, Janani Iyer and Sshivada selected to portray the leading roles. Kalaiyarasan was revealed to be portraying a blind chef, with the team using American chef Christine Hà as a character inspiration for his role. The film was shot in Kanyakumari, Erode, and Chennai throughout the middle of 2016. After the film's production was completed, C. V. Kumar revealed that the film would be titled as Adhe Kangal named after the 1967 film of the same name during September 2016.

Soundtrack

The film's soundtrack is scored by Ghibran. The album was released on 18 January 2017 by Think Music India.

Release
The film was released on 26 January 2017, coinciding with India's Republic Day, having initially been postponed from 14 January 2017. The producers chose to fix the release date of 26 January, three days prior to release, after production house Studio Green announced that they were delaying the release of the big budget, Suriya-starrer Singam 3.

Critical reception
Sify.com praised the film stating it was "a delicious thriller with a meaty, realistic plot and nicely fleshed out characters and not to forget a smart running time of 120 minutes", adding "the film is engaging mainly due to the characterizations and subtle humor, which provides quality entertainment till the end". Likewise, Behindwoods.com wrote Adhe Kangal was "an intelligently woven script that becomes predictable at places, but all the same a good watch", singling out Ghibran for his work as the music composer. While singling out praise for actress Sshivada's performance, Baradwaj Rangan of The Hindu wrote "not as good as it sounds on paper, but not bad either" and stated "here’s a great story, but the screenplay isn’t tight".

Awards
 Ananda Vikatan Cinema Awards 2018
Best Actress in Negative role - Sshivada
 7th South Indian International Movie Awards 2018
Best Supporting Actress - Sshivada

References

External links
 

2010s Tamil-language films
2017 films
Films scored by Mohamaad Ghibran
Indian action thriller films
Films about blind people in India
Tamil films remade in other languages
Films about con artists
2017 directorial debut films
2017 thriller films
Indian romantic thriller films